

Events

January 

 January 11 – Sir Charles Kingsford Smith makes the first commercial flight between Australia and New Zealand.
 January 17 – The United States Congress votes in favour of Philippines independence, against the wishes of U.S. President Herbert Hoover.
 January 28 – "Pakistan Declaration": Choudhry Rahmat Ali publishes (in Cambridge, UK) a pamphlet entitled Now or Never; Are We to Live or Perish Forever?, in which he calls for the creation of a Muslim state in northwest India that he calls "Pakstan"; this influences the Pakistan Movement.
 January 30
 National Socialist German Workers Party leader Adolf Hitler is appointed Chancellor of Germany by President of Germany Paul von Hindenburg.
 Édouard Daladier forms a government in France in succession to Joseph Paul-Boncour. He is succeeded on October 26 by Albert Sarraut and on November 26 by Camille Chautemps.

February 

 February 1 – Adolf Hitler gives his "Proclamation to the German People" in Berlin.
 February 3 – Adolf Hitler gives a secret speech to his military leaders, outlining his plans to rearm Germany in defiance of the Treaty of Versailles, and to adopt a policy of Lebensraum in eastern Europe.
 February 5 – A mutiny starts on the Royal Netherlands Navy coastal defence ship De Zeven Provinciën in the Dutch East Indies. After 6 days, it is bombed by a Dutch aircraft, killing 23 men, and the remaining mutineers surrender. 
 February 6–7 – Officers on the USS Ramapo record a 34-meter high sea-wave in the Pacific Ocean.
 February 9 – The King and Country debate: The Oxford Union student debating society in England passes a resolution stating, "That this House will in no circumstances fight for its King and country."
 February 10 – The New York City-based Postal Telegraph Company introduces the first singing telegram.
 February 15 – In Miami, Giuseppe Zangara attempts to assassinate President-elect Franklin D. Roosevelt, but instead fatally wounds the Mayor of Chicago, Anton Cermak.
 February 17 – The Blaine Act passes the United States Senate, submitting the proposed Twenty-first Amendment to the Constitution to the states for ratification. The amendment is ratified on December 5, ending prohibition in the United States.
 February 27 – Reichstag fire: Germany's parliament building in Berlin, the Reichstag building, is set on fire under controversial circumstances. The following day, the Reichstag Fire Decree is passed in response to the Reichstag fire, nullifying many German civil liberties.
 February 28 – English cricket team in Australia in 1932–33: The England cricket team wins The Ashes using the controversial bodyline tactic.

March 

 March 3 - 1933 Sanriku earthquake: A powerful earthquake and tsunami hit Honshū, Japan, killing approximately 3,000 people.
 March 4
 Franklin D. Roosevelt (FDR) is sworn in as the 32nd president of the United States, beginning his "first 100 days". In reference to the Great Depression, he proclaims "The only thing we have to fear, is fear itself" in his inauguration speech. It is the last time Inauguration Day in the United States occurs on March 4.
 The Parliament of Austria is suspended because of a quibble over procedure; Chancellor Engelbert Dollfuss initiates authoritarian rule by decree, an origin of Austrofascism.
 March 5
 The Great Depression: President Franklin D. Roosevelt declares a "Bank holiday", closing all United States banks and freezing all financial transactions (the 'holiday' ends on March 13).
 March 1933 German federal election: National Socialists gain 43.9% of the votes.
 March 7 – The real-estate trading board game Monopoly is invented in the United States.
 March 10 – The 6.4  Long Beach earthquake shakes Southern California with a maximum Mercalli intensity of VIII (Severe), killing 115 people.
 March 12 – Great Depression: Franklin Delano Roosevelt addresses the nation for the first time as President of the United States, in the first of his "Fireside chats".
 March 14 – Indonesian Association football club Persib Bandung is founded as Bandoeng Inlandsche Voetbal Bond.
 March 15
 The Dow Jones Industrial Average rises from 53.84 to 62.10. The day's gain of 15.34%, achieved during the depths of the Great Depression, remains the largest 1-day percentage gain for the index.
 Austrian Chancellor Engelbert Dollfuss keeps members of the National Council from convening, starting the Austrofascist dictatorship.
 March 20
 Dachau, the first Nazi concentration camp, is completed in Germany (it opens March 22 to hold political prisoners).
 First of a series of meetings in the United States called by Jewish organizations calling for an international anti-Nazi boycott in response to the persecution of German Jews.
 Giuseppe Zangara, the attempted assassin of Franklin D. Roosevelt, is executed by the electric chair.
 March 22 – President Franklin Roosevelt signs an amendment to the Volstead Act known as the Cullen–Harrison Act, allowing the manufacture and sale of "3.2 beer" (3.2% alcohol by weight, approximately 4% alcohol by volume) and light wines.
 March 23 – Gleichschaltung: The Reichstag passes the Enabling Act, making Adolf Hitler effectively the dictator of Germany.
 March 27 – Japan announces it will leave the League of Nations (due to a cancellation period of exactly two years, the egression becomes effective March 27, 1935). 
 March 29 – Welsh journalist Gareth Jones makes the first report in the West of the Holodomor famine-genocide in Ukraine.
 March 31 – The Civilian Conservation Corps is established, with the mission of relieving rampant unemployment in the United States.

April 

 April 1 – The recently elected Nazis (under Julius Streicher) organize a one-day boycott of all Jewish-owned businesses in Germany.
 April 2 – As a member of the English cricket team touring New Zealand, 1933, batsman Wally Hammond scores a record 336 runs in a test match at Eden Park, Auckland.
 April 3
 An anti-monarchist rebellion occurs in Siam (Thailand).
 The first flight over Mount Everest is made by the British Houston-Mount Everest Flight Expedition, led by the Marquis of Clydesdale, and funded by Lucy, Lady Houston.
 April 4 – American airship Akron crashes off the coast of New Jersey, killing 73 of its 76 crewmen. It is the worst aviation accident in history up to this date (and until 1950).
 April 5
 The International Court of Justice in The Hague decides that Greenland belongs to Denmark, and condemns Norwegian landings on eastern Greenland. Norway submits to the decision.
 President of the United States Franklin D. Roosevelt declares a national emergency and issues Executive Order 6102, making it illegal for U.S. citizens to own substantial amounts of monetary gold or bullion.
 April 7
 Sale of some beer is legalized in the United States under the Cullen-Harrison Act of March 22, eight months before the full repeal of Prohibition in December.
 The Law for the Restoration of the Professional Civil Service is passed in Germany, the first law of the new regime directed against Jews (as well as political opponents).
 April 11 – Aviator Bill Lancaster takes off from Lympne in England, in an attempt to make a speed record to the Cape of Good Hope, but vanishes (his body is not found in the Sahara Desert until 1962).
 April 13 – The Children and Young Persons Act is passed in the United Kingdom.
 April 21 – Nazi Germany outlaws the kosher ritual shechita.
 April 24
 Persecution of Jehovah's Witnesses in Nazi Germany begins with seizure of the Bible Students' office in Magdeburg.
 Jewish physicians in Nazi Germany are excluded from official insurance schemes, forcing many to give up their practices.
 April 26
 The Gestapo secret police is established in Nazi Germany by Hermann Göring.
 Editors of the Harvard Lampoon steal the Sacred Cod of Massachusetts from the State House (it is returned two days later).
 April 27 – The Stahlhelm veterans' organization joins the Nazi party in Germany.

May 

 May 2
 Gleichschaltung: Adolf Hitler prohibits trade unions.
 The first alleged modern sighting of the Loch Ness Monster occurs.
 May 3
 In the Irish Free State, Dáil Éireann abolishes the oath of allegiance to the British Crown.
 Nellie Tayloe Ross becomes the first woman to be named director of the United States Mint.
 May 5 – The detection by Karl Jansky of radio waves from the center of the Milky Way Galaxy is reported in The New York Times. The discovery leads to the birth of radio astronomy.
 May 8 – Mohandas Gandhi begins a 3-week hunger strike, because of the mistreatment of the lower castes in India.
 May 10 – Paraguay declares war on Bolivia.
 May 17 – Vidkun Quisling and Johan Bernhard Hjort form the Nasjonal Samling (the National-Socialist Party) of Norway.
 May 18 – New Deal: President Franklin Delano Roosevelt signs an act creating the Tennessee Valley Authority.
 May 26 – The Nazi Party in Germany introduces a law to legalize eugenic sterilization.
 May 27
 New Deal in the United States: The Federal Securities Act is signed into law, requiring the registration of securities with the Federal Trade Commission.
 The Century of Progress World's Fair opens in Chicago.

June 

 June – The Holodomor famine-genocide in Ukraine reaches its peak, with 30,000 deaths from man-made starvation each day. The average life expectancy for a Ukrainian male born this year is 7.3 years. 
 June 5 – The U.S. Congress abrogates the United States' use of the gold standard, by enacting a joint resolution nullifying the right of creditors to demand payment in gold.
 June 6 – The first drive-in movie theater opens in Pennsauken Township, near Camden, New Jersey.
 June 12 – The London Economic Conference is held.
 June 17 – Union Station massacre: In Kansas City, Missouri, Pretty Boy Floyd kills an FBI agent, 3 local police, and the person they intended to rescue, captured bank robber Frank Nash.
 June 21 – All non-Nazi political parties are forbidden in Germany.
 June 25 – Wilmersdorfer Tennishallen delegates convene in Berlin to protest against the persecution of Jehovah's Witnesses in Nazi Germany.
 June 26 – The American Totalisator Company unveils its first electronic pari-mutuel betting machine, at the Arlington Park race track near Chicago and the founding of 20th Century Pictures.

July 

 July 1
 The London Passenger Transport Board begins operation.
 Business Plot: Smedley Butler becomes involved in a coup attempt led by Gerald MacGuire against President of the United States Franklin Delano Roosevelt which fails (according to his own testimony in 1934).
 July 4 – Gandhi is sentenced to prison in India.
 July 6 – The first Major League Baseball All-Star Game is played at Comiskey Park in Chicago.
 July 8 – The first rugby union test match is played between the Wallabies of Australia and the Springboks of South Africa, at Newlands in Cape Town.
 July 14 – In Nazi Germany:
 Formation of new political parties is forbidden.
 The Law for the Prevention of Hereditarily Diseased Offspring is enacted, allowing compulsory sterilization of citizens suffering from a list of alleged genetic disorders.
 July 15
 The Four-Power Pact is signed by Britain, France, Germany and Italy.
 The International Left Opposition (ILO) is renamed the International Communist League (ICL).
 July 20 – Reichskonkordat: Vatican state secretary Eugenio Pacelli (later Pope Pius XII) signs an accord with Germany.
 July 22
 Wiley Post becomes the first person to fly solo around the world, landing at Floyd Bennett Field in Brooklyn, New York, after traveling eastabout  in 7 days 18 hours 45 minutes.
 "Machine Gun Kelly" and Albert Bates kidnap Charles Urschel, an Oklahoma oilman, and demand $200,000 ransom.

August 

 August 1 – The Blue Eagle emblem of the National Recovery Administration in the United States is displayed publicly for the first time.
 August 2 – The Stalin White Sea–Baltic Canal, a 227 km ship canal constructed using forced labour in the Soviet Union, opens, connecting the White Sea with Lake Onega and the Baltic.
 August 7 – Simele massacre: More than 3,000 Assyrian Iraqis are killed by Iraqi government troops.
 August 12 – Winston Churchill makes his first speech publicly warning of the dangers of German rearmament.
 August 14 – Loggers cause a forest fire in the Coast Range of Oregon, later known as the first forest fire of the Tillamook Burn. It is extinguished on September 5, after destroying .
 August 25 – The Diexi earthquake shakes Mao County, Sichuan, China and kills 9,000 people.
 August 30 – German-Jewish philosopher Theodor Lessing is shot in Marienbad (Mariánské Lázně), Czechoslovakia, dying the following day.

September 

 September 12
 Alejandro Lerroux forms a new government in Spain.
 Leó Szilárd, waiting for a red light on Southampton Row in Bloomsbury, conceives the idea of the nuclear chain reaction.
 September 26 – A hurricane destroys the town of Tampico, Mexico.

October 

 October 1 – Engelbert Dollfuss, leader of the Fatherland's Front in Austria, is seriously injured in a failed assassination attempt.
 October 7 – Air France is formed by the merger of five French airline companies, beginning operations with 250 planes.
 October 10 – 1933 United Airlines Boeing 247 mid-air explosion: A bomb destroys a United Airlines Boeing 247 on a transcontinental flight in mid-air near Chesterton, Indiana, killing all 7 on board, in the first proven case of sabotage in civil aviation, although no suspect is ever identified.
 October 12 – The United States Army Disciplinary Barracks on Alcatraz is acquired by the United States Department of Justice, which plans to incorporate the island into its Federal Bureau of Prisons as a penitentiary.
 October 13 – The British Interplanetary Society is founded.
 October 14 – Germany announces its withdrawal from the League of Nations and the World Disarmament Conference, after the U.S., the U.K. and France deny its request to increase its defense armaments under the Versailles Treaty.
 October 14–16 – The new constitution of Estonia is approved only on the third consecutive referendum.
 October 16 – Parricides committed in the United States by Victor Licata lead to calls for the legal prohibition of cannabis.
 October 17 – Scientist Albert Einstein arrives in the United States, where he settles permanently as a refugee from Nazi Germany, and takes up a position at the Institute for Advanced Study, Princeton, New Jersey.

November 

 November 5 – Spanish Basque people vote for autonomy.
 November 8 – New Deal: U.S. President Franklin D. Roosevelt unveils the Civil Works Administration, an organization designed to create jobs for more than 4 million of the unemployed.
 November 11 – Dust Bowl: In South Dakota, a very strong dust storm ("the great black blizzard") strips topsoil from desiccated farmlands (one of a series of disastrous dust storms this year).
 November 12 – Japan Precision Optical Industry, predecessor of the global Canon camera and photocopier brand is founded in Japan.
 November 16
 The United States and the Soviet Union establish formal diplomatic relations.
 American aviator Jimmie Angel becomes the first foreigner to see the Angel Falls in Venezuela (they are named after him).
 November 19 – Second Spanish Republic: General elections result in victory by the right-wing parties.
 November 22 – The Fujian People's Government is declared in Fujian Province, China.

December 

 December 5 – The Twenty-first Amendment to the United States Constitution is ratified, repealing Prohibition.
 December 15 – The 21st Amendment officially goes into effect, making alcohol legal in the United States.
 December 17 - The first NFL Championship game in American football is played. The Chicago Bears defeat the New York Giants 23-21.
 December 21
 Newfoundland returns to Crown colony status, following financial collapse.
 The British Plastics Federation (the oldest in the world) is founded.
 December 23 – Lagny-Pomponne rail accident: A train crash in Lagny, France kills over 200.
 December 26
 The Nissan Motor Company is organized in Tokyo, Japan.
 FM radio is patented.
 December 29 – Members of the Iron Guard assassinate Ion Gheorghe Duca, prime minister of Romania.

Date unknown 
 Turkey concludes a treaty with the creditors of the former Ottoman Empire to schedule the payments in Paris (Turkey succeeds in clearing all the debt in less than twenty years).
 The first dated Inter-School Christian Fellowship group is started in Australia at North Sydney Boys High School, with the group continuing into the 21st century.
 The Adélaïde Concerto, a spurious work attributed to Wolfgang Amadeus Mozart, is published as "edited" (actually composed) by Marius Casadesus.

Births

January 

 January 1 – Joe Orton, English playwright (d. 1967)
 January 2 – On Kawara, Japanese conceptual artist (d. 2014)
 January 6 – Oleg Grigoryevich Makarov, Russian cosmonaut (d. 2003)
 January 7 – Diane Leather, English athlete (d. 2018)
January 8
Supriya Devi, Indian Bengali actress (d. 2018)
Charles Osgood, American radio and television commentator
 January 12 – Liliana Cavani, Italian film director and screenwriter
 January 13 – Tom Gola, American basketball player (d. 2014)
 January 14 – Stan Brakhage, American filmmaker (d. 2003)
 January 15 – Ernest J. Gaines, American author (d. 2019)
 January 16 – Susan Sontag, American author (d. 2004)
 January 17
 Dalida, French singer (d. 1987)
 Shari Lewis, American ventriloquist (d. 1998)
 Prince Sadruddin Aga Khan, French U.N. High Commissioner for Refugees (d. 2003)
 January 18
 David Bellamy, English author, broadcaster, environmental campaigner and botanist (d. 2019) 
 John Boorman, English film director
 January 21 – Habib Thiam, Senegal politician (d. 2017)
 January 23 
 Bill Hayden, Australian politician, 21st Governor-General of Australia
 Chita Rivera, American actress, dancer
 January 25 – Corazon Aquino, 11th President of the Philippines (d. 2009)
 January 27 – Nikolai Fadeyechev, Soviet and Russian ballet dancer and teacher (d. 2020)
 January 28 – Jack Hill, American film director

February 

 February 2 – Tony Jay, English-American actor and voice artist (d. 2006)
 February 5 
 Miguel d'Escoto Brockmann, Nicaraguan diplomat, politician and priest (d. 2017)
 Jörn Donner, Finnish writer, film director and politician (d. 2020)
 February 8
 Archduke Joseph Árpád of Austria, Austro-Hungarian royal (d. 2017) 
 Elly Ameling, Dutch soprano
 February 12 – Costa-Gavras, Greek-born director, writer
 February 13
 Paul Biya, 2nd President of Cameroon
 Kim Novak, American actress
 Emanuel Ungaro, French fashion designer (d. 2019)
 February 14 – Madhubala, Indian actress (d. 1969)
 February 17 – Syed Sajjad Ali Shah, 13th Chief Justice of Pakistan (d. 2017)
 February 18
 Yoko Ono, Japanese-born singer, artist and widow of John Lennon
 Sir Bobby Robson, English soccer player, manager (d. 2009)
Frank Moores, second Premier of Newfoundland and Labrador (d. 2005)
 February 21 
 Bob Rafelson, American film director, producer, and screenwriter (d. 2022)
 Nina Simone, African-American singer (d. 2003)
 February 22 
 Katharine, Duchess of Kent, British royal, musician and patron of the arts 
 Christopher Ondaatje, Ceylonese-born travel writer, biographer and philanthropist
 February 23 – Lee Calhoun, American athlete (d. 1989)
 February 25 – Marino Bollini, former Captain Regent of San Marino (d. 2020)
 February 26 – Lubomyr Husar, Ukrainian Catholic bishop (d. 2017)
 February 28 – Charles Vinci, American weightlifter (d. 2018)

March 

 March 3
 Alfredo Landa, Spanish actor (d. 2013)
 Tomas Milian, Cuban-American-Italian actor (d. 2017)
 Lee Radziwill, American socialite, sister of Jacqueline Kennedy Onassis (d. 2019)
 March 7 – Jackie Blanchflower, Northern Irish footballer (d. 1998)
 March 12 – Jesús Gil, Spanish right-wing politician, construction businessman and football team owner (d. 2004)
 March 13 – Mike Stoller, American songwriter
 March 14
 Margrith Bigler-Eggenberger Swiss judge (d. 2022)
 Sir Michael Caine, English actor and author
 René Felber, Swiss Federal Councillor (d. 2020)
 Quincy Jones, African-American music producer, composer
 March 15 
 Philippe de Broca, French film director (d. 2004)
 Ruth Bader Ginsburg, Associate Justice of the Supreme Court of the United States (d. 2020)
 March 17 – Penelope Lively, English writer
 March 18 – Unita Blackwell, African-American civil rights activist (d. 2019)
 March 19
 Edward G. Robinson Jr., American actor (d. 1974)
 Philip Roth, American novelist (d. 2018)
 Michel Sabbah, Israeli patriarch
 Renée Taylor, American actress, screenwriter, playwright, producer and director
 March 22 
 Abolhassan Banisadr, 1st President of Iran (d. 2021)
 May Britt, Swedish actress
 Buddy MacKay, American politician, diplomat, 42nd Governor of Florida
 March 23 – Philip Zimbardo, American psychologist, professor at Stanford University
 March 27 – Michel Guérard, French chef
 March 28 – Tete Montoliu, Catalonian jazz pianist (d. 1997)
 March 30 – Jean-Claude Brialy, French actor and director (d. 2007)
 March 31 – Nichita Stănescu, Romanian poet and essayist (d. 1983)

April 

 April 1
 Dan Flavin, American artist (d. 1996)
 Claude Cohen-Tannoudji, French physicist and Nobel laureate
 April 4 
 Frits Bolkestein, Dutch politician
 Brian Hewson, English athlete (d. 2022)
 April 5 – Frank Gorshin, American actor (Batman) (d. 2005)
 April 6 – Henryk Niedźwiedzki, Polish boxer (d. 2018) 
 April 7 
 Wayne Rogers, American actor (M*A*S*H) (d. 2015)
 Seyyed Hossein Nasr, Persian-American Islamic scholar
 April 9 
 Jean-Paul Belmondo, French actor (d. 2021)
 Gian Maria Volonté, Italian actor (d. 1994)
 April 11 – Denis Goldberg, South African social campaigner (d. 2020)
 April 12
 Montserrat Caballé, Catalan operatic soprano (d. 2018)
 Ben Nighthorse Campbell, American politician
 April 14 
 Yuri Oganessian, Russian nuclear physicist
 Boris Strugatsky, Soviet-Russian science fiction author (d. 2012)
 April 15
 Roy Clark, American country musician (d. 2018)
 Elizabeth Montgomery, American actress (Bewitched) (d. 1995)
 April 16 – Marcos Alonso, Spanish footballer (d. 2012)
 April 19 – Jayne Mansfield, American actress (d. 1967)
 April 21 – Ian Carr, Scottish jazz musician, composer, writer and educator (d. 2009)
 April 23 – Frederic Pryor, American economist (d. 2019)
 April 25 – Jerry Leiber, American composer (d. 2011)
 April 26
 Carol Burnett, American actress, singer and comedian
 Arno Allan Penzias, German-born physicist and Nobel laureate
 Filiberto Ojeda Ríos, Puerto Rican activist (d. 2005)
 April 29
 Mark Eyskens, Prime Minister of Belgium
 Rod McKuen, American singer, songwriter and poet (d. 2015)
 Willie Nelson, American singer, songwriter, musician, actor, producer, author, poet and activist
 April 30 – Vittorio Merloni, Italian entrepreneur (d. 2016)

May 

 May 3
 James Brown, African-American soul musician (I Got You (I Feel Good)) (d. 2006)
 Steven Weinberg, American physicist and Nobel laureate (d. 2021)
 May 5 – Ratnasiri Wickremanayake, 2-time prime minister of Sri Lanka (d. 2016)
 May 7
 Johnny Unitas, American football player (d. 2002)
 Nexhmije Pagarusha, Albanian singer and actress (d. 2020)
 May 10 – Barbara Taylor Bradford, English writer
 May 11 – Louis Farrakhan, African-American Muslim leader
 May 14 – Siân Phillips, Welsh actress
 May 18
 H. D. Deve Gowda, Indian politician, 11th Prime Minister of India
 Carroll Hardy, American baseball player (d. 2020)
 May 21 – Maurice André, French trumpeter (d. 2012)
 May 22 – Chen Jingrun, Chinese mathematician (d. 1996)
 May 23 – Joan Collins, English actress (Dynasty)
 May 27 – Edward S. Rogers Jr., Canadian businessman and philanthropist (d. 2008)
 May 29 – Helmuth Rilling, German conductor

June 

 June 1
 Charlie Wilson, American politician (d. 2010)
 Haruo Remeliik, 1st president of Palau (d. 1985)
 June 3 – Celso Torrelio, 58th president of Bolivia (d. 1999)
 June 4 – Godfried Danneels, Belgian cardinal (d. 2019)
 June 6 – Heinrich Rohrer, Swiss physicist, Nobel Prize laureate (d. 2013)
 June 7
 Juan R. Torruella, Puerto Rican Olympic sailor and jurist (d. 2020) 
 Beverly Wills, American actress (d. 1963)
 June 8 – Joan Rivers, American actress, comedian, television host (d. 2014)
 June 10 – F. Lee Bailey, American lawyer (d. 2021)
 June 11 – Gene Wilder, American actor (d. 2016)
 June 12 – Eddie Adams, American photographer and photojournalist (d. 2004)
 June 13 – Sven-Olov Sjödelius, Swedish sprint canoeist (d. 2018)
 June 14 
 Svetlin Rusev, Bulgarian artist (d. 2018)
 Henri, Count of Paris, French noble (d. 2019)
 June 15 – Mohammad-Ali Rajai, 2nd president of Iran, 47th prime minister of Iran (d. 1981)
 June 17 – Maurice Stokes, American basketball player (d. 1970)
 June 19 – Viktor Patsayev, Russian cosmonaut (d. 1971)
 June 20 
 Danny Aiello, American actor (d. 2019)
 Peter T. Kirstein, British computer scientist (d. 2020)
 June 21 – Bernie Kopell, American actor and comedian 
 June 22
 Dianne Feinstein, American politician, Senator and mayor of San Francisco
 Libor Pešek, Czech conductor (d. 2022)
 June 23 – Abel Alier, South Sudanese politician and judge
 June 24
 Sam Jones, American basketball player (d. 2021)
 Ngina Kenyatta, First Lady of Kenya
 June 25 
 James Meredith, American civil rights activist and writer 
 Hong Sook-ja, South Korean politician, feminist
 Álvaro Siza, Portuguese architect
 June 26 – Claudio Abbado, Italian conductor (d. 2014)
 June 28 – V. Sasisekharan, Indian molecular biologist
 June 29 – Hayes Alan Jenkins, American figure skater
 June 30 – Lea Massari, Italian actress

July 

 July 3
 Carmen Barbará, Spanish comics artist, illustrator
 Lidy Stoppelman, Dutch figure skater
 July 6 – Reza Davari Ardakani, Iranian philosopher
 July 7
 J. J. Barrie, Canadian songwriter and singer
 Murray Halberg, New Zealand runner (d. 2022)
 July 9 – Oliver Sacks, English-born neurologist (d. 2015)
 July 10 – Bernard P. Randolph, United States Air Force General (d. 2021)
 July 11 
 Joyce Piliso-Seroke, South-African educator, activist, feminist and community organizer
 György Czakó, Hungarian figure skater 
 Robert Spence, British engineer
 July 14
 Franz, Duke of Bavaria, German royal
 Dumaagiin Sodnom, 13th prime minister of Mongolia
 July 15
 Julian Bream, English guitarist and lutenist (d. 2020)
 Guido Crepax, Italian comics artist (d. 2003)
 M. T. Vasudevan Nair, Indian writer
 July 16
 Julian Klymkiw, Canadian ice hockey player (d. 2022)
 Julian A. Brodsky, American businessman
 Gheorghe Cozorici, Romanian actor (d. 1993)
 July 17 – Karmenu Mifsud Bonnici, 9th prime minister of Malta (d. 2022)
 July 18
 Gaston Orellana, Spanish painter
 Syd Mead, American industrial and conceptual designer (d. 2019)
 Jean Yanne, French humorist and film actor and director (d. 2003)
 Yevgeny Yevtushenko, Russian poet (d. 2017) 
 July 19 – Michel Lévêque, French diplomat and politician
 July 20 – Cormac McCarthy, American Pulitzer Prize-winning author
 July 21 – Herman Timme, Dutch decathlete
 July 23 – Richard Rogers, Italian-born British architect (d. 2021)
 July 29 – Lou Albano, Italian-American professional wrestler, manager and actor (d. 2009)

August 

 August 1 – Dom DeLuise, American actor, comedian (d. 2009)
 August 2 – Tom Bell, English actor (d. 2006)
 August 4
 Sheldon Adelson, American businessman and casino magnate (d. 2021)
 Anthony Anenih, Nigerian politician (d. 2018)
 August 6 – Suchinda Kraprayoon, 19th Prime Minister of Thailand
 August 7
 Elinor Ostrom, American economist, academic and Nobel Prize laureate (d. 2012)
 Jerry Pournelle, American science fiction writer (d. 2017)
 August 9 - Tetsuko Kuroyanagi, Japanese actress, Goodwill Ambassador for UNICEF
 August 10
 Silvia Caos, Cuban-Mexican actress (d. 2006)
 Doyle Brunson, American poker player
 Lynn Cohen, American actress (d. 2020)
 August 11 – Jerry Falwell, American evangelist, conservative political activist (d. 2007)
 August 14
 Robert Harold Porter, Canadian businessman, farmer and politician (d. 2018) 
 Richard R. Ernst, Swiss chemist, Nobel Prize laureate (d. 2021)
 August 15 – Lori Nelson, American actress and model (d. 2020)
 August 16
 Julie Newmar, American actress (Batman) 
 Stuart Roosa, American astronaut (d. 1994)
 Ricardo Blume, Peruvian-Mexican actor and theater director (d. 2020)
 August 17 – Gene Kranz, American NASA Flight Director
 August 18 
 Roman Polanski, Polish film director
 Fiachra Ó Ceallaigh, Irish Roman Catholic prelate (d. 2018)
 August 20 – George J. Mitchell, American lawyer, businessman, author and politician
 August 21 – Dame Janet Baker, English mezzo-soprano
 August 23 – Robert Curl, American chemist, Nobel Prize laureate (d. 2022)
 August 24 
 Guillermo Bredeston, Argentine actor (d. 2018)
 Ham Richardson, American tennis player (d. 2006)
 August 25 
 Wayne Shorter, American jazz saxophonist and composer (d. 2023)
 Tom Skerritt, American actor
 August 27 – Kerstin Ekman, Swedish novelist
 August 29 – Arnold Koller, Swiss Federal Councillor
 August 31 – Claudio Rodríguez, Spanish voice actor (d. 2019)

September 

 September 1
 T. Thirunavukarasu, Sri Lankan Tamil politician (d. 1982)
 Conway Twitty, American country music artist (d. 1993)
 September 2 
 Ed Conlin, American basketball player (d. 2012)
 Mathieu Kérékou, 5th President of Benin (d. 2015)
 September 3 – Tompall Glaser, American singer (d. 2013)
 September 8 – Asha Bhosle, Indian musician
 September 9 – Michael Novak, American philosopher, author (d. 2017)
 September 10
 Yevgeny Khrunov, Russian cosmonaut (d. 2000)
 Karl Lagerfeld, German fashion designer, artist (d. 2019)
 September 11 – William Luther Pierce, American Neo-Nazi and far-right activist (d. 2002)
 September 13 – Mahant Swami Maharaj (b. Vinu Patel), Indian Hindu guru
 September 14 – Hillevi Rombin, Swedish athlete, model and Miss Universe 1955 (d. 1996)
 September 15 – Rafael Frühbeck de Burgos, Spanish conductor (d. 2014)
 September 17 
 Arsenio Corsellas, Spanish actor (d. 2019)
 Chuck Grassley, American politician
 Evelyn Kawamoto, American competition swimmer (d. 2017)
 Dorothy Loudon, American actress and singer (d. 2003)
 September 18
 Scotty Bowman, Canadian ice hockey coach
 Robert Blake, American actor (d. 2023)
 Fred Willard, American actor and comedian (d. 2020)
 September 19 – David McCallum, Scottish actor 
 September 21 – Anatoly Krutikov, Russian footballer and manager (d. 2019)
 September 24 – Raffaele Farina, Italian cardinal, archivist of the Holy Roman Church
 September 25 – Hubie Brown, American basketball coach, broadcaster
 September 27
 Kathleen Nolan, American actress
 Will Sampson, American actor (d. 1987)
 September 29 – Samora Machel, President of Mozambique (d. 1986)
 September 30
 Ajitesh Bandopadhyay, Indian actor, playwright and director (d. 1983) 
 Cissy Houston, American singer
 Dirce Migliaccio, Brazilian actress (d. 2009)

October 

 October 2
 John Gurdon, British developmental biologist, recipient of the Nobel Prize in Physiology or Medicine
 Dave Somerville, Canadian singer (The Diamonds) (d. 2015)
 Waldo Von Erich, Canadian professional wrestler (d. 2009)
 October 3 – Abdon Pamich, Italian Olympic athlete
 October 9 – Peter Mansfield, British physicist and Nobel laureate (d. 2017)
 October 10 – Jay Sebring, American hair stylist (d. 1969)
 October 11 – Thomas Atcitty, American politician (d. 2020)
 October 13 – Mark Zakharov, Soviet and Russian film and theater director (d. 2019)
 October 17
 William Anders, American astronaut
 Jeanine Deckers, Belgian nun, known as "The Singing Nun" (d. 1985)
 October 18 – Firuz Mustafayev, Azerbaijani politician (d. 2018)
 October 19 – Dom Geraldo Majella, Brazilian Roman Catholic Cardinal
 October 24
 Draga Olteanu Matei, Romanian actress (d. 2020)
 Reginald Kray, British gangster (d. 2000)
 Ronald Kray, British gangster (d. 1995)
 October 27 – Jan Hettema, Springbok cyclist and five times South African National Rally Champion (d. 2016)
 October 28 – Garrincha, Brazilian footballer (d. 1983)

November 

 November 3
 John Barry, British film score composer (d. 2011)
 Ken Berry, American actor, dancer and singer (d. 2018)
 Jeremy Brett, British actor (d. 1995)
 Aneta Corsaut, American actress (d. 1995)
 Amartya Sen, Indian economist, Nobel Prize laureate
 C. K. Jaffer Sharief, Indian politician (d. 2018)
 Michael Dukakis, American politician, former governor of Massachusetts, and 1988 presidential candidate
 November 4 – Charles K. Kao, Chinese electrical engineer, physicist and Nobel laureate (d. 2018)
 November 6
 Else Ackermann, German physician, pharmacologist and politician (d. 2019)
 Knut Johannesen, Norwegian speed-skater
 November 9 – Lucian Pintilie, Romanian film director, screenwriter (d. 2018)
 November 10
 Don Clarke, New Zealand rugby football player (d. 2002)
 Seymour Nurse, Barbadian cricketer (d. 2019)
 November 11 – Keiko Tanaka-Ikeda, Japanese artistic gymnast
 November 14 – Fred Haise, American astronaut in Apollo 13
 November 21 – T. Rasalingam, Sri Lankan Tamil politician
 November 23 – Krzysztof Penderecki, Polish composer and conductor (d. 2020)
 November 25
 Tunku Abdul Rahman, Malaysian aristocrat (d. 1988) 
 Kathryn Crosby, American actress
 November 26 – Robert Goulet, American entertainer (d. 2007)
 November 28 – Hope Lange, American actress (d. 2003)
 November 29
 Francisco Cuoco, Brazilian actor
 John Mayall, English blues musician

December 

 December 1 – Lou Rawls, American singer, songwriter, actor, voice actor and record producer (d. 2006)
 December 2 – Mike Larrabee, American Olympic athlete (d. 2003)
 December 3 – Paul J. Crutzen, Dutch chemist, Nobel Prize laureate (d. 2021)
 December 4
 Tengku Ampuan Afzan, Queen of Malaysia (d. 1988)
 Horst Buchholz, German actor (d. 2003) 
 Wink Martindale, American game show host and disc jockey
 December 6 – Henryk Górecki, Polish composer (d. 2010)
 December 8 – Johnny Green, American basketball player
 December 9 – Milton Gonçalves, Brazilian actor and television director (d. 2022)
 December 10 – Mako, Japanese-born actor (d. 2006)
 December 11 – Aquilino Pimentel Jr., Filipino politician (d. 2019)
 December 12 – Manu Dibango, Cameroonian saxophonist (d. 2020)
 December 13 – Lou Adler, American film and record producer
 December 14
 Justin Rakotoniaina, 3rd prime minister of Madagascar (d. 2001)
 Eva Wilma, Brazilian actress (d. 2021)
 December 15 
 Tim Conway, American actor and comedian (d. 2019)
 Ralph T. O'Neal, 4th and 6th Premier of the Virgin Islands (d. 2019)
 December 17 – Shirley Abrahamson, American jurist, Chief Justice of the Wisconsin Supreme Court (d. 2020)
 December 18 – Lonnie Brooks, American blues singer and guitarist (d. 2017)
 December 19 – Galina Volchek, Soviet and Russian actress (d. 2019)
 December 20 – Jean Carnahan, American politician
 December 22 – Abel Pacheco, 44th President of Costa Rica
 December 23 – Akihito, 125th Emperor of Japan
 December 25 – Phan Văn Khải, 5th Prime Minister of Vietnam (d. 2018)
 December 26
 Emmanuel Dabbaghian, Syrian Armenian Catholic patriarch (d. 2018)
 Caroll Spinney, American puppeteer (d. 2019)
 December 30 – Andy Stewart, Scottish singer, entertainer (d. 1993)

Date unknown 
 Jalal Talabani, Kurdish President of Iraq (d. 2017)

Deaths

January 

 January 3
 Wilhelm Cuno, German businessman, politician and 15th Chancellor of Germany (b. 1876)
 Jack Pickford, Canadian-born actor, film director and producer (b. 1896)
 January 5
Calvin Coolidge, 30th President of the United States (b. 1872)
J. M. Robertson, British Liberal Party politician, writer and journalist, Parliamentary Secretary to the Board of Trade (b. 1856)
 January 7 – Bert Hinkler, Australian pioneer aviator (b. 1892)
 January 9 
 Kate Gleason, American engineer (b. 1865)
 Daphne Akhurst, Australian tennis champion (b. 1903)
 January 10 – Roberto Mantovani, Italian geologist (b. 1854)
 January 17 – Louis Comfort Tiffany, American stained glass artist, jewelry designer, son of Charles Lewis Tiffany
 January 25 – Lewis J. Selznick, American film producer (b. 1870)
 January 29
 Thomas Coward, British ornithologist (b. 1867)
 Sara Teasdale, American lyrical poet (b. 1884)
 January 31 – John Galsworthy, British writer, Nobel Prize laureate (b. 1867)

February 
 February 5
 James Banning, American aviation pioneer (b. 1900)
 Josiah Thomas, Australian politician (b. 1863)
 February 12 
 Henri Duparc, French composer (b. 1848)
 Sir William Robertson, British field marshal (b. 1860)
 February 14 – Carl Correns, German botanist, geneticist (b. 1864)
 February 15 – Pat Sullivan, Australian-born American director, producer of animated films (b. 1885)
 February 18 – James J. Corbett, American boxer (b. 1866)
 February 26
 Spottiswoode Aitken, British-American actor (b. 1868)
 Grand Duke Alexander Mikhailovich of Russia (b. 1866)
 February 27 – Walter Hiers, American actor (b. 1893)

March 

 March 1 – Uładzimir Žyłka, Belarusian poet (b. 1900)
 March 2 - Thomas J. Walsh, American politician (b. 1859)
 March 6
 Anton Cermak, Mayor of Chicago, Illinois (assassinated) (b. 1873)
 Cyril R. Jandus, American lawyer and politician (b. 1867)
 March 10 – Ahmed Sharif as-Senussi, Chief of the Senussi order in Libya (b. 1873)
 March 13 
 Andon Dimitrov, Bulgarian revolutionary leader (b. 1867)
 Robert T. A. Innes, South African astronomer (b. 1861)
 March 14
 Balto, American sled dog (b. 1919)
 Antonio Garbasso, Italian physicist, politician (b. 1871)
 March 15 - Gustavo Jiménez, Interim President of Peru (b. 1886)
 March 18 – Prince Luigi Amedeo, Duke of the Abruzzi, Italian mountaineer, explorer and admiral (b. 1873)
March 19 - Erhard Heiden, German Nazi officer and 3rd commander Reichsführer-SS of the Schutzstaffel (b. 1901)
 March 20 – Giuseppe Zangara, American attempted assassin of Franklin D. Roosevelt (b. 1900)
 March 26 – Eddie Lang, American musician (b. 1902)
 March 30 – Dan O'Connor, Canadian prospector (b. 1864)
 March 31 – Baltasar Brum, 23rd President of Uruguay (b. 1883)

April 

 April 1 – Frederic Thesiger, 1st Viscount Chelmsford, British politician and colonial governor, Viceroy of India (b. 1868)
 April 2 – Ranjitsinhji, Indian cricketer and ruler of Nawanagar. (b. 1872)
 April 4 – William A. Moffett, U.S. admiral (crash of airship ) (b. 1869)
 April 7 - Archduke Charles Stephen of Austria (b. 1860)
April 15 - Mary Isabella Macleod, North American pioneer (b. 1852)
 April 17 – Harriet Brooks, Canadian physicist (b. 1876)
 April 20 - William Courtenay, Canadian actor, director (b. 1875)
 April 22
 Prince Ludwig Philipp of Thurn and Taxis (b. 1901)
 Sir Henry Royce, English car manufacturer (b. 1863)
 April 23 – Tim Keefe, American baseball player, MLB Hall of Famer (b. 1857)
 April 30 – Luis Miguel Sánchez Cerro, 77th Prime Minister of Peru, 48th President of Peru (assassinated) (b. 1889)

May 

 May 2 – Leonard Huxley, British writer (b. 1860)
 May 3 – Frederick Kerr, English actor (b. 1858)
 May 6 – Li Ching-Yuen, Chinese herbalist, martial artist and tactical advisor
 May 13 – Ernest Torrence, British actor (b. 1878)
 May 15 – Hermann von François, German general (b. 1856)
 May 16 – John Henry Mackay, German writer (b. 1864)
 May 19 – Thomas J. O'Brien, American politician, diplomat (b. 1842)
 May 22 – Sándor Ferenczi, Hungarian psychoanalyst (b. 1873)
 May 24
 Ludovic Arrachart, French aviator (b. 1897)
 Percy C. Mather, British Protestant missionary (b. 1882)
 Rosslyn Wemyss, 1st Baron Wester Wemyss, British admiral (b. 1864)
 May 26 
 Horatio Bottomley, British politician and businessman (b. 1860)
 Jimmie Rodgers, American country singer (b. 1897)

June 

 June 2 – Frank Jarvis, American athlete (b. 1878)
 June 7 – Cyrus H. K. Curtis, American publisher (b. 1850)
 June 15 - Hildegard Burjan, German Roman Catholic nun and blessed (b. 1883)
 June 18 - Harry Sweet, American actor and director (b. 1901)
 June 21 - Halbert Benton Cole, Georgetown University Law School Alumni, American Attorney in Black River Falls, Wi and Hamilton, Montana (b. 1879)Cole, H.B.
 June 25
 Jean Cugnot, French Olympic cyclist (b. 1899)
 Giovanni Giacometti, Swiss painter (b. 1868)
 June 29 – Roscoe Arbuckle, American actor, comedian, film director and screenwriter (b. 1887)

July 

 July 3 
 Hipólito Yrigoyen, 18th President of Argentina (b. 1852)
 Franz Wilhelm Seiwert, German painter, sculptor (b. 1894)
 July 6 - Robert Kajanus, Finnish conductor and composer (b. 1856)
 July 11 - Edward Dillon, American actor, director (b. 1879)
 July 15
 Irving Babbitt, American literary critic (b. 1865)
 Freddie Keppard, American jazz musician (b. 1890)
 Léon de Witte de Haelen, Belgian general (b. 1857)
 July 18 – Charles Prince, French actor (b. 1872)
 July 27 – Nobuyoshi Mutō, Japanese field marshal, ambassador (b. 1868)

August 
 August 1 – Sulejman Delvina, Albanian politician, 5th Prime Minister of Albania (b. 1884)
 August 10 – Alf Morgans, Australian politician, 4th Premier of Western Australia (b. 1850)
 August 13 – Hasan Prishtina, Albanian politician, 8th Prime Minister of Albania (b. 1873)
 August 18 – James Williamson, British film director (b. 1855)
 August 22 – Alexandros Kontoulis, Greek general (b. 1858)
 August 23 
 Marie Cahill, American singer, actress (b. 1866)
 Adolf Loos, Austrian-Czechoslovak architect (b. 1870)
 August 30 – Kustaa Ahmala, Finnish politician (b. 1867)

September 
 September 2 – Francesco de Pinedo, Italian aviator (b. 1890)
 September 7 – Edward Grey, 1st Viscount Grey of Fallodon, British statesman (b. 1862)
 September 8 – King Faisal I of Iraq (b. 1885)
 September 10 – Giuseppe Campari, Italian opera singer, Grand Prix driver (b. 1892)
 September 17 
 Jules Culot, French entomologist (b. 1861)
 Joseph De Piro, Maltese Roman Catholic priest, missionary and Servant of God (b. 1877)
 September 20 – Annie Besant, British Theosophist, women's rights activist, writer and orator (b. 1847)
 September 21 – Kenji Miyazawa, Japanese novelist and poet of children's literature (b. 1896)
 September 24 – Dorothea Baird, British actress (b. 1875)
 September 25
 Paul Ehrenfest, Austrian-Dutch physicist (b. 1880)
 Ring Lardner, American writer (b. 1885)
 September 26 – William Kennedy-Cochran-Patrick, British-born flying ace (b. 1896)
 September 28
 Alexander von Krobatin, Austro-Hungarian field marshal and politician (b. 1849)
 G. R. S. Mead, British writer (b. 1863)

October 

 October 4 – Edward Lyon Buchwalter, American Union captain and businessman (b. 1841)
 October 5 – Renée Adorée, French actress (b. 1898)
 October 7 – Jo Labadie, American labor organizer (b. 1850)
 October 16 – Ismael Montes, Bolivian general and political figure, 26th President of Bolivia (b. 1861)
 October 27 - Emily Murphy, Canadian woman's rights activist (b. 1868)
 October 29 
 George Luks, American painter (b. 1867)
 Albert Calmette, French bacteriologist, immunologist (b. 1863)
 Paul Painlevé, French mathematician and statesman, 62nd Prime Minister of France (b. 1863)

November 
 November 3 – Pierre Paul Émile Roux, French physician (b. 1853)
 November 5 – Texas Guinan, American actress, producer and entrepreneur (b. 1884)
 November 6 – Andrey Lyapchev, 22nd Prime Minister of Bulgaria (b. 1866)
 November 8
 Pietro Albertoni, Italian psychologist, politician (b. 1849)
 Mohammed Nadir Shah, King of Afghanistan (b. 1883)
 November 16 – Kyrillos III of Cyprus, archbishop of the Cypriot Orthodox Church (b. 1859)
 November 18 - Francisco Javier Gaxiola, Mexican diplomat, lawyer and politician (b. 1870)
 November 20  - Augustine Birrell, English politician and author (b. 1850)
 November 21 - Inez Clough, American actress (b. 1873)
 November 23 – François Albert, French journalist (b. 1874)
 November 30 – Sir Arthur Currie, Canadian general (b. 1875)

December 
 December 2 
 Clarence Burton, American actor (b. 1882)
 Émile Meyerson, Polish-French epistemologist, chemist and philosopher (b. 1859)
 December 4 – Stefan George, German poet (b. 1868)
 December 6 – Auguste Chapuis, French composer (b. 1858)
 December 8
 Yamamoto Gonnohyoe, Imperial Japanese army officer, 8th Prime Minister of Japan (b. 1852)
 Karl Jatho, German airplane pioneer (b. 1873)
 John Joly, Irish physicist (b. 1857)
 December 10 – János Hadik, 19th prime minister of Hungary (b. 1863)
 December 16 – Robert W. Chambers, American writer (b. 1865)
 December 17
Thubten Gyatso, 13th Dalai Lama (b. 1876)
Oskar Potiorek, Austro-Hungarian general (b. 1853)
 December 18 – Hans Vaihinger, German philosopher (b. 1852)
 December 19
 George Jackson Churchward, English Great Western Railway chief mechanical engineer (b. 1857)
 Friedrich von Ingenohl, German admiral (b. 1857)
 December 21
 Dora Montefiore, English suffragist and socialist (b. 1851)
 Knud Rasmussen, Danish polar explorer and anthropologist (b. 1879)
 Tod Sloan, American jockey (b. 1874)
 December 24 – Prince Aribert of Anhalt
 December 25 – Francesc Macià, President of the Generalitat (autonomous government of Catalonia) (b. 1859)
 December 26 
 Anatoly Lunacharsky, Russian Marxist revolutionary (b. 1875)
 Eduard Vilde, Estonian writer (b. 1865)
 December 29 – Ion G. Duca, 35th Prime Minister of Romania (b. 1879)

Nobel Prizes 

 Physics – Erwin Schrödinger and Paul Adrien Maurice Dirac
 Chemistry – not awarded
 Physiology or Medicine – Thomas Hunt Morgan
 Literature – Ivan Alekseyevich Bunin
 Peace – Sir Norman Angell (Ralph Lane)

References

External links
 The 1930s Timeline: 1933 – from American Studies Programs at The University of Virginia